Ernest Allen may refer to:

Ernest John Bartlett Allen (1884–1945), British socialist
Ernest Allen (American football) (born 1973), American football player
Ernest Allen (cricketer) (1880–1943), English cricketer
Pokey Allen (Ernest Allen, 1943–1996), football coach at Portland State and Boise State
Ernest Allen (Australian politician) (1910–1984), Australian politician

See also
Ernie Allen (born 1946), attorney serving as the President & CEO of the National Center for Missing & Exploited Children
Allen (surname)